Yes Indeed! is an album by pianist Claude Hopkins with saxophonist Buddy Tate and trumpeter Emmett Berry recorded in 1960 and originally released by the Swingville label.

Track listing
 "It Don't Mean a Thing" (Duke Ellington, Irving Mills) – 5:35
 "Willow Weep for Me" (Ann Ronell) – 7:21
 "Yes, Indeed" (Sy Oliver) – 7:01
 "Is It So" (Claude Hopkins, Osie Johnson) – 4:22
 "Empty Bed Blues" (J. C. Johnson) – 6:27
 "What Is This Thing Called Love?" (Cole Porter) – 3:26
 "Mornin' Glory" (Ellington) – 4:27

Personnel 
Claude Hopkins – piano
Buddy Tate – tenor saxophone
Emmett Berry – trumpet
Wendell Marshall – bass
Osie Johnson – drums

References 

1960 albums
Claude Hopkins albums
Buddy Tate albums
Emmett Berry albums
Swingville Records albums
Albums recorded at Van Gelder Studio
Albums produced by Esmond Edwards